Javier Carballo is a Spanish entrepreneur who has developed his professional career mainly in the new technologies and entertainment sectors.

He was born in Madrid on August 19, 1961 secondary school being Salesianos of Atocha, also in Madrid. In 1985 he graduates in Marketing and Commerce at ESIC Business & Marketing School, and follow different courses at IESE Business School, in Madrid; at École Supérieure des Sciences Économiques et Commerciales-ESSEC, in Paris; and at University of Michigan.

Having lived in France and in the United States, in 1990 returned to Spain to work in the organization of the Barcelona Olympic Games as Purchasing and Sponsors Director. From 1993 he resides permanently in Madrid though with short professional stays in countries as China and México. Added to his business activity, he participates in philanthropic activities, is visiting professor at ESIC Business & Marketing School and participates in conferences on innovation and entrepreneurship.

Passionate of reading and flying, he is the father of three children.

Business Activity
Javier Carballo founded several companies in the last 14 years. In 1999 creates Loyalt-eCommerce, Internet portal that will become later the professional services website of the company of telecommunications Vodafone.

In 2004 together with a pool of financial investors founded a company in Madrid to develop a themed park for children called Micropolix. Opened in 1999 by the President of the Community of Madrid Doña Esperanza Aguirre, in its 9400 m2 recreates a real city with all its common occupations (firefighters, police, supermarket, airport, road safety circuit,...). There, children aged 5 to 13 years, play grown-up, understanding how society works and learning at the same time universal values such as tolerance and coexistence. The success of the concept was absolute and only two years after its opening the park had already received over 1,5 million visitors. Since then the park has deserved wide praise to its educational merits. Amid the honors received:  "Childhood 2009 Award"; "Protagonist of Education 2012 Award". In 2009 Javier Carballo was awarded with the prestigious "Best Entrepreneur of the Year"  and in early 2010 he opted to divest from the company to start new challenges.

Awards
 Accesit to Aster Award (1984) 
 Aster Award in the area of Commercial Research (1985) 
 Aster Award for Best Entrepreneur of the Year 2009

Philanthropy
Javier Carballo is a member of Rotary International, the largest and oldest humanitarian service organization in the world with one and half million members spread across hundreds of countries, since 1905 contributing to various projects of social improvement. Among them the best known global project: the so-called Polio-Plus program aimed at total eradication of polio. Since its inception in 1985, Rotarians have helped to make this project reach its goal contributing a total of over 500 million dollars and tens of thousands of volunteer man-hours for the inoculation of more than one billion vaccines to children around world.

References

Articles
 Es Emocion y es Alma, AESIC Magazine, March 2010
 Oportunidades en el sector del ocio, AESIC Magazine, July 2012

External links
 Leaders, Cinco Dias newspaper
 Micropolix, Edutainment Theme Park
 Parquempresarial.com
 TV Interview
 XX Encuentro de Emprendedores Colegio Oficial de Ingenieros Industriales
 II Congreso de Emprendedores Iniciador
 Presentation at the I Foro Movistar Con Tu Negocio
 Agoranews. Interview at the I Foro Movistar Con Tu Negocio

1961 births
Living people
Spanish businesspeople
University of Michigan alumni